Roy J. Wells is a prominent lobbyist in Pennsylvania, working as President and Managing Director of Triad Strategies, a Harrisburg, Pennsylvania-based lobbying firm.

He earned a degree in politics from Fairfield University and a master's degree in political science at Penn State University. He worked as a staffer in the Pennsylvania General Assembly, where he was rural policy coordinator and budget analyst for the House Appropriations Committee, overseeing economic development programs. He was deputy state treasurer for the Pennsylvania Department of the Treasury.

The Pennsylvania Report named him to the 2003 "The Pennsylvania Report Power 75" list of influential figures in Pennsylvania politics. In 2009, the Pennsylvania Report named him to "The Pennsylvania Report 100" list of influential figures in Pennsylvania politics, calling him a "continual presence among key power players in Harrisburg."

References

Living people
Pennsylvania lobbyists
Fairfield University alumni
Pennsylvania State University alumni
Year of birth missing (living people)